Wang Qiang was the defending champion, but chose not to participate this year.

Rebecca Peterson won her first WTA singles title, defeating Elena Rybakina in the final, 6–2, 6–0.

Seeds

Draw

Finals

Top half

Bottom half

Qualifying

Seeds

Qualifiers

Draw

First qualifier

Second qualifier

Third qualifier

Fourth qualifier

Fifth qualifier

Sixth qualifier

References

External links
Main Draw
Qualifying Draw

Jiangxi International Women's Tennis Open - Women's Singles
2019 Women's Singles